Rene Stephan (born May 7, 1988) is a professional Canadian football linebacker.  He was drafted 23rd overall in the fourth round of the 2012 CFL Draft by the Blue Bombers and signed with the team on May 11, 2012. He played college football for the Harding Bison. He was released by the Winnipeg Blue Bombers on November 2, 2014.

References

External links
Winnipeg Blue Bombers bio

1988 births
Living people
Canadian football linebackers
Harding Bisons football players
Players of Canadian football from Ontario
Sportspeople from St. Catharines
Winnipeg Blue Bombers players